St. Mary's Church and Cemetery is a historic Roman Catholic church building and cemetery in Crompton, a village of West Warwick, Rhode Island.

Description
The neo-Gothic building was constructed in 1844. The building is the oldest Catholic church still in use in the Roman Catholic Diocese of Providence. The church building was added to the National Register of Historic Places in 1978.

Notable burials include Civil War Medal of Honor recipient Charles Hawkins (1834/35–1908), Pro-football player Frank Maznicki (1920–2013), and MLB player Mike Roarke (1930–2019).

See also
 Catholic Church in the United States
 Catholic parish church
 Index of Catholic Church articles
 National Register of Historic Places listings in Kent County, Rhode Island
 Pastoral care

References

External links 
 
 
 
 

Churches in the Roman Catholic Diocese of Providence
Cemeteries on the National Register of Historic Places in Rhode Island
Roman Catholic churches completed in 1845
19th-century Roman Catholic church buildings in the United States
Buildings and structures in West Warwick, Rhode Island
Churches on the National Register of Historic Places in Rhode Island
Churches in Kent County, Rhode Island
Roman Catholic churches in Rhode Island
National Register of Historic Places in Kent County, Rhode Island